Second Moon Township, in Beaver County, Pennsylvania, existed from 1800 to 1812.

History
Second Moon Township was apparently created from Moon Township, Allegheny County at the creation of Beaver County in 1800.

Second Moon Township was one of three original townships south of the Ohio River in Beaver County at Beaver County's creation on 12 March 1800. Second Moon Township became extinct when the area in Beaver County south of the Ohio River was reorganized into four townships in 1812.

Notes

See also
 First Moon Township, Beaver County, Pennsylvania

References

Former townships in Pennsylvania
1800 establishments in Pennsylvania
1810s disestablishments in Pennsylvania
Townships in Beaver County, Pennsylvania